Statistics of the Cambodian League for the 1998 season.

Overview
Royal Dolphins won the championship.

References
RSSSF

C-League seasons
Cambodia
Cambodia
football